Lesley Chilcott is an American documentary film director and producer. Notable feature documentary films include Watson, Waiting for "Superman", CodeGirl, It Might Get Loud, and An Inconvenient Truth which won two Academy Awards. Chilcott is known for documentaries about social justice issues such as climate change, the environment, women's equality, and education.

Filmography
Feature-Length Films:
 An Inconvenient Truth (2006)
 It Might Get Loud (2008)
 Waiting for “Superman” (2010)
 Gahan Wilson: Born Dead, Still Weird (2013)
 A Small Section of the World (2014)
 CodeGirl (2015)
 An Inconvenient Sequel: Truth to Power (2017)
 Maxima (2019)
 Watson (2019)

Television Series: 
 Helter Skelter: An American Myth (2020)
 The Making of a Haunting: The Amityville Murders (2022)

References

External links

Official Website

Living people
American film producers
American documentary film directors
American documentary film producers
American women documentary filmmakers
Year of birth missing (living people)
21st-century American women